Álvaro de Figueroa (24 December 1893 – 11 October 1950) was a Spanish polo player. He competed at the 1920 Summer Olympics and the 1924 Summer Olympics, winning a silver medal in 1920.

References

External links
 

1893 births
1950 deaths
Spanish polo players
Polo players at the 1920 Summer Olympics
Polo players at the 1924 Summer Olympics
Olympic medalists in polo
Olympic polo players of Spain
Olympic silver medalists for Spain
Medalists at the 1920 Summer Olympics
Sportspeople from Madrid